The Boatswain Bay Migratory Bird Sanctuary (variant: Baie Boatswain Migratory Bird Sanctuary) is a migratory bird sanctuary that extends between Nunavut and Quebec, Canada.  It is located in Boatswain Bay an arm of James Bay, and the Quebec headland. It was established on 29 January 1941 and consists of 17,900 hectares It was established in 1941. It is classified Category IV by the International Union for Conservation of Nature.

Of the 16,289.4 hectares, the land surface, governed by Quebec, totals 9,553 hectares, while the marine surface, governed by Nunavut, totals 6,736.4 hectares.

Other designations
Boatswain Bay is a Canadian Important Bird Area (#NU097); the MBS is situated within the IBA. The bay is also classified as a Biodiversity Reserve, and a Key Migratory Bird Terrestrial Habitat site.

Notable species
The predominant bird species include:
 American black duck
 Atlantic brant
 Canada goose
 Lesser snow goose

References

Bird sanctuaries of Qikiqtaaluk Region
Important Bird Areas of Qikiqtaaluk Region
James Bay
Protected areas established in 1941
1941 establishments in Canada
Migratory Bird Sanctuaries of Canada
Protected areas of Nord-du-Québec